Sigean is a commune in the Aude department in southern France. It formerly laid on Route nationale 9 between Narbonne and Perpignan, but RN 9 (downgraded to route départementale 6009) now bypasses the town of Sigean and is itself bypassed by the A9 autoroute.

Population

Culture
 The Musée des Corbières in Sigean is a museum dedicated to history and archaeology.
 The L.A.C Lieu d'Art Contemporain, located in Hameau du lac, hosts arts exhibition and performances in a former winery.
 The Zoo Réserve Africaine de Sigean

See also
 Corbières AOC
 Communes of the Aude department

References

Communes of Aude
Aude communes articles needing translation from French Wikipedia